Gerald J. McKelvey (March 1, 1946 – April 23, 2009) was a former Republican member of the Pennsylvania House of Representatives.

References

Republican Party members of the Pennsylvania House of Representatives
2009 deaths
1946 births
20th-century American politicians